Max Baratz (born November 11, 1934) is a retired major general in the United States Army. He is a former chief of the United States Army Reserve, a position he held from February 1, 1994, to May 24, 1998.

References

United States Army generals
1934 births
Living people
People from Aurora, Illinois
Military personnel from Illinois